Sergei Alexander Schelkunoff (January 27, 1897 – May 2, 1992), who published as S. A. Schelkunoff, was a distinguished mathematician, engineer and electromagnetism theorist who made noted contributions to antenna theory.

Biography
Schelkunoff was born in Samara, Russia in 1897, attended the University of Moscow before being drafted in 1917. He crossed Siberia into Manchuria and then Japan before settling in Seattle in 1921. There he received bachelor's and master's degrees in mathematics from the State College of Washington, now Washington State University, and in 1928 received his Ph.D. from Columbia University for his dissertation On Certain Properties of the Metrical and Generalized Metrical Groups in Linear Spaces of  Dimension.

After receiving his degree, Schelkunoff joined Western Electric's research wing, which became Bell Laboratories. In 1933 he and Sally P. Mead began analysis of waveguide propagation discovered analytically by their colleague George C. Southworth. Their analysis uncovered the transverse modes. Schelkunoff appears to have been the first to notice the important practical consequences of the fact that attenuation in the TE01 mode decays inversely with the  power of the frequency. In 1935 he and his colleagues reported that coaxial cable, then new, could transmit television pictures or up to 200 telephone conversations.

During his 35 year career at Bell Labs, Schelkunoff's research included radar, electromagnetic wave propagation in the atmosphere and in microwave guides, short-wave radio, broad-band antennas, and grounding. He taught for five years at Columbia University, and later served as assistant director of mathematical research and assistant vice president for university relations. He retired from Columbia U. in 1965, and served as a consultant on magnetrons for the United States Naval Station at San Diego.

Schelkunoff received 15 patents, the IEEE Morris N. Liebmann Memorial Award from the Institute of Radio Engineers (1942), and the Franklin Institute's Stuart Ballantine Medal (1949). He died on 2 May 1992, in Hightstown, New Jersey.

Selected works

Articles

Books

Patents
  – Ultra short wave radio system – Bell Laboratories

References

Other sources 

 
 
 
 

1897 births
1992 deaths
Scientists from Samara, Russia
People from Samarsky Uyezd
Russian military personnel of World War I
White Russian emigrants to the United States
20th-century American mathematicians
20th-century American engineers
Microwave engineers
American telecommunications engineers
American electrical engineers
Moscow State University alumni
Columbia University faculty
Columbia School of Engineering and Applied Science faculty
Scientists at Bell Labs